Nanni Loy (born Giovanni Loi; 23 October 1925 – 21 August 1995) was an Italian film, theatre and TV director. Specifically, Nanni Loy was Sardinian, and one of several notable Sardinian film makers, including Franco Solinas.

Biography

Loy was born in Cagliari, Sardinia: his father was Guglielmo Loy-Donà, a lawyer issue from a distinguished Sardinian-Venetian family, and his mother was the noblewoman Donna Anna Sanjust of the Marquesses of Neoneli. Rosetta Loy, an Italian novelist, is his sister-in-law.

He became famous for introducing in Italy the candid camera with his show Specchio segreto (Secret mirror) in 1965.

His 1962 film The Four Days of Naples was nominated for two Academy Awards. It also won the FIPRESCI Prize at the 3rd Moscow International Film Festival in 1963.

His 1971 film Detenuto in attesa di giudizio was entered into the 22nd Berlin International Film Festival. The star, Alberto Sordi, won the Silver Bear for Best Actor award.

He specialized in comedy films such as Padre di famiglia but he also shot film dealing with social themes (Detenuto in attesa di giudizio and Sistemo l'America e torno).

Loy died at Fregene, near Rome, in 1995.

Partial filmography

 Parola di ladro (1956) (with Gianni Puccini)
 Il marito (1958) (with Gianni Puccini)
 Audace colpo dei soliti ignoti (1959)
 Un giorno da leoni (1961)
 Le quattro giornate di Napoli (1962)
 Beautiful Families (1964)
 Made in Italy (1965)
 Il padre di famiglia (1967)
 Rosolino Paternò soldato (1970)
 Detenuto in attesa di giudizio (1971)
 Sistemo l'America e torno (1973)
 Signore e signori, buonanotte (1976)
 Quelle strane occasioni (1976), fragment "Italian Superman", credited as Anonymous
 Basta che non-si sappia in giro (1976)
 Café Express (1980)
 Testa o croce (1982)
 Mi manda Picone (1983)
 Amici miei atto III (1985)
 Scugnizzi (1989)
 Pacco, doppio pacco e contropaccotto'' (1993)

References

External links

1925 births
1995 deaths
People from Cagliari
People from Sardinia
Italian film directors
Italian theatre directors
Italian television personalities
Nastro d'Argento winners
Centro Sperimentale di Cinematografia alumni